Greatest Hits 2 is the second greatest hits album by American country music artist Toby Keith. It was released on November 9, 2004 by DreamWorks Records, a label Keith worked with the record company from 1999 to 2006.

The compilation contains singles from Keith's first three DreamWorks albums, as well as five new recordings. Three of these new recordings are studio tracks, of which two ("Stays in Mexico" and "Mockingbird") were released as singles, reaching No. 3 and No. 27, respectively, on the Hot Country Songs charts. "Mockingbird", a cover of the Inez and Charlie Foxx hit, features Keith's daughter Krystal as a duet partner. Although this compilation was released a year after Keith's eighth studio album Shock'n Y'all, it does not feature any singles from that album.

The last two tracks on the album are newly recorded live renditions of two of Keith's early hits: his 1993 No. 1 debut single "Should've Been a Cowboy" (originally from his self-titled debut album), and his 1995 No. 2 hit "You Ain't Much Fun" (originally from Boomtown).

Commercial performance
The album was first certified Gold by the RIAA on December 9, 2004, and reached triple platinum on January 11, 2006. It has sold 4,067,900 copies in the United States as of October 2019.

Track listing

Personnel on New Tracks

 Lisa Cochran - background vocals
 Mark Douthit - saxophone
 Roman Dudok - saxophone
 Scotty Emerick - acoustic guitar
 Shannon Forrest - drums
 Paul Franklin - steel guitar
 Kenny Greenberg - electric guitar
 Wes Hightower - background vocals
 Clayton Ivey - Hammond B-3 organ, keyboards, piano
 Gaika James - trombone
 Krystal Keith - duet vocals on "Mockingbird"
 Toby Keith - lead vocals
 Julian King - trumpet, background vocals
 Brent Mason - electric guitar
 Jerry McPherson - electric guitar
 Steve Nathan - Hammond B-3 organ, keyboards, piano
 Michael Rhodes - bass guitar
 Willie Roy Jr. - trumpet
 John Wesley Ryles - background vocals
 Biff Watson - acoustic guitar
 Glenn Worf - bass guitar

Charts

Weekly charts

Year-end charts

Certifications

References

2004 greatest hits albums
Toby Keith compilation albums
DreamWorks Records compilation albums
Albums produced by James Stroud
Albums produced by Toby Keith